Towards the Sun a 1955 Polish documentary film about a Polish sculptor notable for surviving Auschwitz concentration camp Xawery Dunikowski directed by Andrzej Wajda.

References

External links
 

1955 films
1955 documentary films
1955 short films
Films directed by Andrzej Wajda
1950s Polish-language films
Polish black-and-white films
Documentary films about visual artists
Polish short documentary films
1950s short documentary films
Films about sculptors